Bayzak is a village in Naryn Region of Kyrgyzstan. It is part of the Jumgal District. Its population was 6,386 in 2021.

Population

References

Populated places in Naryn Region